The American Institute for Stuttering is an American nonprofit organization that provides universally affordable speech therapy to people who stutter. The organization, legally known as The American Institute for Stuttering Treatment and Professional Training (AIS), was founded in 1998 by speech-language pathologist Catherine Otto Montgomery in New York, New York. The current clinical director is speech-language pathologist Heather Grossman, PhD. AIS currently has offices in New York City, Atlanta, GA, and Minneapolis, MN.

The organization provides stuttering therapy to children and adults, financial assistance to help make therapy affordable, and clinical training to speech-language pathologists seeking specialized knowledge in the treatment of stuttering.

Board of directors
The members of the board of directors are:

Chairman Eric Dinallo – Debevoise & Plimpton LLP
Treasurer Nolan Russo, Jr. – Capital Printing Corporation
Vice Chair Sander Flaum – Flaum Partners, Inc.
Secretary Z. Logan Gould – Maynard, Cooper & Gale, LLP
Aaron Graff – Ferring Pharmaceuticals, Inc
Amish Shah – Goodwin Procter LLP
Anthony Hooper – Biotech
Austin Pendleton – Actor, Director, and Writer
Barry Blaustein – Writer, Director, Producer
Carly Simon – Singer/Songwriter
Chris Coleridge – Hum Nutrition Inc.
Clarence Page – Journalist
David Esseks – Allen and Overy, LLP
David Resnicow – Resnicow and Associates
Emily Blunt – Actress
John Stossel – Fox Business
Julie M. Henson – Taft
Kenyatta Bolden – Prudential Financial
Kenyon Martin – NBA player
Kerri Chase – McDermott Will & Emery LLP
Laureen Coyne – Risk Management Consultant
Norbert Lewandowski – Lewandowski & Company
Rachel Cortese – Speech Language Pathologist, Behavior Therapist
Susan Reichardt – Surface Transportation Board
Will Blodgett – Fairstead
William D. Marsillo – Boies Schiller Flexner LLP

See also

National Stuttering Association
Stuttering Foundation of America
Stuttering therapy

References

External links
American Institute for Stuttering website

Non-profit organizations based in New York (state)
Speech and language pathology
Stuttering associations